Nigerian singer Niniola has released several singles and music videos.

As lead artist

As featured artist

Music videos

References

Discographies of Nigerian artists